Joachim Brendel (27 April 1921 – 7 July 1974) was a Luftwaffe flying ace of World War II. Brendel was credited with 189 aerial victories—that is, 189 aerial combat encounters resulting in the destruction of the enemy aircraft. All but six of his victories were claimed over the Soviet Air Forces on the Eastern Front in more than 950 combat missions, including 162 ground support missions.

Born in Ulrichshalben, Brendel joined the military service in the Luftwaffe of Nazi Germany in 1939. Following flight training, he was posted to 2. Staffel (squadron) of Jagdgeschwader 51 (JG 51—51st Fighter Wing). He flew his first combat missions in Operation Barbarossa, the German invasion of the Soviet Union, and claimed his first aerial victory on 29 June 1941. There, after 101 aerial victories, he was presented with the Knight's Cross of the Iron Cross on 22 November 1943. In July 1944, he was appointed Gruppenkommandeur (group commander) of the III. Gruppe (3rd group) of JG 51 "Mölders". Following his 153rd aerial victory, Brendel was awarded the Knight's Cross of the Iron Cross with Oak Leaves on 14 January 1945. He continued flying operationally until the end of World War II. He died on 7 July 1974 in Cologne, West Germany.

Early life and career
Brendel, the son of a police Hauptmann (captain), was born on 27 April 1921 in Ulrichshalben, present-day a borough of Ilmtal-Weinstraße, at the time in Thuringia of the Weimar Republic. After attending a  Gymnasium, a secondary school, and graduating with his Abitur (diploma), he joined the military service of the Luftwaffe as a Fahnenjunker (cadet) on 15 November 1939. Following fighter pilot training, he was posted to 2. Staffel (squadron) of Jagdgeschwader 51 (JG 51—51st Fighter Wing) in early 1941.

World War II
World War II in Europe had begun on Friday 1 September 1939 when German forces invaded Poland. JG 51, under the command of Oberst Werner Mölders, was preparing for Operation Barbarossa, the German invasion of the Soviet Union which was launched on 22 June 1941. On 29 June, Brendel claimed his first aerial victory. On 1 July, he was promoted to Leutnant (second lieutenant) and two days later he was awarded the Iron Cross 2nd Class.

Brendel then flew a number of ground support missions, was awarded the Iron Cross 1st Class on 21 April 1942. On 8 December, he claimed his 10th victory on his 225th combat mission. He claimed his 20th victory on 24 February 1943 and received the Honor Goblet of the Luftwaffe on 15 March 1943. On 25 May, Brendel was appointed Staffelkapitän (squadron leader) of JG 51s 1. Staffel (1st squadron), replacing Oberleuntant (First Lieutenant) Hans Boos who had been killed in a mid-air collision on 21 April. His number of aerial victories claimed increased to 30 on 5 May, and on 17 May he was awarded the German Cross in Gold. On 10 June, Brendel claimed his 40th opponent shot down and was promoted to Oberleuntant on 1 July.

On the first day of the Battle of Kursk, 5 July 1943, Brendel claimed two Ilyushin Il-2 ground-attack aircraft shot down on the northern flank of the attack. His wingman, Unteroffizier Oskar Romm was credited with the destruction of a third Il-2. The next day, Brendel led his 1. Staffel in an attack against 15 Douglas A-20 Havoc bombers from the 221 Bomber Aviation Division. Brendel claimed one bomber destroyed but the fighter escort from 282 Fighter Aviation Division successfully engaged the German fighters.

Brendel became an "ace-in-a-day" for the first time on 12 July 1943, claiming aerial victories 53 to 57. On 28 July, Brendel was shot down and wounded in his Focke-Wulf Fw 190 A-6 (Werknummer''' 470002—factory number) by Soviet anti artillery behind enemy lines. He managed to return to German held territory. On 1 October 1943, he was promoted to Hauptman with a rank age dated to 1 April 1944. On 22 November, Brendel claimed six aircraft shot down on his 551st combat mission, taking his total to 101 aerial victories. For this achievement he was awarded the Knight's Cross of the Iron Cross that day. He was the 60th Luftwaffe pilot to achieve the century mark.

Group commander
On 29 July 1944, Brendel claimed a Yakovlev Yak-9 fighter shot down in the vicinity of Białystok. His opponent may have been Kapitan Vladimir Shchegolev from the 162nd Fighter Aviation Regiment, a fighter ace credited with 14 individual and three shared victories who was killed in action that day. On 1 September 1944, Brendel was appointed Gruppenkommandeur (group commander) of III. Gruppe of JG 51. He succeeded Hauptmann Diethelm von Eichel-Streiber in this function who was transferred. Command of 1. Staffel was briefly passed to Leutnant Gerhard Mai before Leutnant Kurt Dombacher was given command of the Staffel on 10 September.

Flying with III. Gruppe on 16 October 1944, Brendel achieved his 150th victory on his 792nd combat mission. Following his 153rd victory, he was awarded the Knight's Cross of the Iron Cross with Oak Leaves on 14 January 1945, the 697th officer or soldier of the Wehrmacht so honored. He continued flying on the Eastern Front, claiming his 174th and 175th victory on 4 March 1945. End of March, he was ordered to Berlin where the presentation of the Oak Leaves was made at the Reichsluftfahrtministerium (RLM— Ministry of Aviation) in Berlin by Reichsmarschall Hermann Göring.

On 18 February 1945, III. Gruppe claimed six aerial victories during the battle of the Courland Pocket, including four by Brendel. Two days later, he claimed three further victories. He claimed his last victory came on the 25 April 1945, finishing the war with 189 victories and emerged as JG 51 highest claiming fighter pilot on the Eastern Front, including over 90 heavily armored Ilyushin Il-2 ground-attack aircraft.

Later life
He died on 7 July 1974 in Cologne, West Germany and was buried in Salzburg, Austria.

Summary of career
Aerial victory claims
According to US historian David T. Zabecki, Brendel was credited with 189 aerial victories. Mathews and Foreman, authors of Luftwaffe Aces – Biographies and Victory Claims, researched the German Federal Archives and found records for 178 aerial victory claims, plus 13 further unconfirmed claims. This number includes one claim over a United States Army Air Forces flown B-17 Flying Fortress, and 177 Soviet Air Forces piloted aircraft on the Eastern Front.

Victory claims were logged to a map-reference (PQ = Planquadrat), for example "PQ 07813". These sectors were then subdivided into 36 smaller units to give a location area 3 × 4 km in size.

Awards
 Iron Cross (1939)
 2nd Class (3 July 1941)
 1st Class (21 April 1942)
 Honour Goblet of the Luftwaffe on 15 March 1943 as Leutnant and pilot
 German Cross in Gold on 17 May 1943 as Leutnant in the 2./Jagdgeschwader 51
 Knight's Cross of the Iron Cross with Oak Leaves
 Knight's Cross on 22 November 1943 as Oberleutnant and Staffelkapitän of the 1./Jagdgeschwader 51 "Mölders"
 697th Oak Leaves on 14 January 1945 as Hauptmann and Gruppenkommandeur of the III./Jagdgeschwader'' 51 "Mölders"

Notes

References

Citations

Bibliography

 
 
 
 
 
 
 
 
 
 
 
 
 
 
 
 
 
 
 
 
 

1921 births
1974 deaths
People from Weimarer Land
Luftwaffe pilots
German World War II flying aces
Recipients of the Gold German Cross
Recipients of the Knight's Cross of the Iron Cross with Oak Leaves
Military personnel from Thuringia